Boochamma Boochodu is a 2014 Indian Telugu Horror-Comedy film directed by Rewan Yadu. The film features a honeymooning couple, Karthik (Shivaji) and Sravani (Kainaaz Motiwala),in their new farm house are punctuated by an aberration - ominous signs of the palatial house. The mysterious of the terrorizing spirits form the storyline. Supporting cast include comedians Brahmanandam, Vennela Kishore, Posani Krishna Murali, Venu, Tagubothu Ramesh, Dhanraj and Chammak Chandra.

Cast
Sivaji as Kartik
Kainaz Motivala as Sravani
Brahmanandam as Charan, Kartik's uncle
Posani Krishna Murali as Tantrik
Vennela Kishore
Thagubothu Ramesh
Chammak Chandra as Yadagiri
Ravi Varma
Chitram Seenu

Soundtrack

Release

References

2014 films
2010s Telugu-language films
2014 comedy horror films
Indian comedy horror films